ValeFest, previously known as The Vale Festival, is a charitable summer music and arts festival that takes place on the Vale, a park and student accommodation site at the University of Birmingham, in Birmingham, England now going into its 19th year.

It is planned, organised and largely staffed by volunteer students - it is believed to be the largest solely student-organised event in the UK and the largest student-run charity festival in Europe. Every year it is held on the Saturday after summer examinations finish and all proceeds go towards charities selected earlier in the academic year. So far it has raised over £200,000. The capacity of the 2019 event was 5,000.

The committee is a student group associated with University of Birmingham Guild of Students, the university's students' union.

The beginning of each year sees the nomination and selection of charities that each year would raise money for, from social justice matters and adolescent mental health, to general poverty causes. There are several stages at the festival on the day, as well as comedy and performance tents, society events and workshops, and an after-party.

History

2000s 

With the aims of both raising money and awareness for AIDS-related causes and addressing the lack of live music on campus, the Birmingham University Stop AIDS society attempted to arrange a large festival at the Guild Building in 2005. The Guild of Students pulled out, deeming the event unfeasible. Simultaneously a much larger event was being planned on University (rather than guild) property: The Vale Festival. The Vale Festival team, an independent group of students and the Student Stop Aids committee joined forces. Local bands, student societies and the large team of volunteer organisers worked to make the event, held in the Vale student village, a substantial success in June 2005. The chosen focus was the crisis in Sudan. £12,000 was raised, and the event was widely viewed as a major success.

The Vale Festival 2006 took place on 6 June. Attended by over 3,900 students, and raising approximately £25,000 for two charities - UNICEF and SPW, for their HIV/AIDS projects in Kenya and Zimbabwe respectively - the event was hailed as probably the biggest and best event ever to be staged at The University of Birmingham. Highlights of the day included performances from numerous bands, singers and DJs - Old School Tie, The Anomalies, First Rate, Vijay Kashore and the 360 headlined again, pulling in a crowd of over 200 students which created an amazing end to a great line up of live bands. DJ, drumming and singing workshops also went on throughout the day, as did drama performances, healing spaces and many stalls run by student societies. The day culminated in an outdoor cinema screening of The Constant Gardener, and three different rooms for the club night inside Shackleton Hall.

The 2007 festival was held on 12 June, with just over 5,000 students on the day. The event aimed to raise awareness of the humanitarian effects of climate change on people in poorer nations. Vale Festival '07 supported two charities, Kids for Kids and Action Aid, and raised over £30,000.

The line-up was as follows:

Main Stage: The Anomalies, The Tommys, Laid Blak, Floors and Walls, Hobbit, Lazy J, Old School Tie, Friendly Fire, Stanley's Choice, University Gospel Choir
Kids for Kids Chillout Tent: Transient Dreams, Two Spot Gobi, Yamit Mamo, Swing Manouche, Tanante, The Old Dance School, KTB, Kid-iD, Hannah Rhodes
ActionAid Dance Arena: Deepgroove, Will Bailey, Aries, Far Too Loud, Joebot, Mikee Lazy, Hobbit & Bass6, Fat Gold Chain, DJ Shei.

Vale Festival 2008 took place on 10 June and had near the full capacity of 5500. The theme for the year was 'Water for Life', with the festival focussed on the issue of sustainable access to clean water in the developing world and raised £30,000 for WaterAid, Play Pumps and Pump Aid. The main stage, dance tent and Hilltop Tent were headlined by Misty's Big Adventure, Andy Morris and Watch this Fire Spread respectively. There was a generous mix of entertainment throughout the festival, including African drumming, wood carving and capoeira. The open air cinema screening was of Shooting Dogs and the after-party took place on The Vale within the University.

Vale Festival 2009 took place on 9 June, with the charitable causes being chosen as Self Help Africa and FareShare. The ethic proposed was to 'Unite Against Hunger'.

The Main Stage, Hill-Top Tent and Forest Edge Stage were headlined by 360, Picture Book and Rafiki and Tangawizi respectively. With the growth of the festival since its introduction in 2005, more stages were added as well as workshop spaces, societies and stalls among others. The Jungle Jam was also introduced- encouraging students to create their own unique musical experience.

Once again the festival was committed to raising awareness for ethical causes. The ideals promoted were to "Think Globally, Act locally" and "We must be the change we want to see in the world". The chosen causes were a direct result of these ideals, with both charities working towards the sustainable use of natural resources, reducing the vulnerability to Aids and the redistribution of food aid to areas of intense poverty.

2010s 

Vale Festival 2010 took place on 8 June, with the charitable causes being chosen as Oxfam, Procedo Foundation and the Malaria Consortium. The focus was on raising money and awareness for projects supporting sufferers of malaria. The 2010 programme also stated that since its formulation over £115,000 had been donated to charitable causes.

The Main Stage, Hill Top Tent, Forest Edge and Jungle Jam were headlined by Scarlet Harlots, Lucy Ward, Bigger Than Barry and Uprizing respectively. Once again the range of live performance, interactive workshops and stalls was widened. These included bicycle-powered smoothies, a vintage clothes stall and live graffiti and art battles. There was also an outdoor screening of The Hurt Locker, as well as the official after party.

The ethical causes were chosen to raise the awareness of those who suffer with malaria in the face of extreme poverty. The money raised by ValeFest was donated directly to training for health workers, education and the treatment and diagnosis for the prevention of malaria. As well as this, money was donated toward the construction of sanitation systems in Kirakhadi, with the long-term goal being the prevention of disease.

Vale Festival 2011 took place on 15 June, with the Helen Bamber Foundation and the Calla Trust being chosen as the causes.

The Main Stage, Hill Top Tent and Dance Tent were headlined by 360, Rachel Harlow and Tom Leech Trio, and Seedy Sonics respectively. The workshops included (in part) dancing, circus skills, fire spinning and yoga. Creative workshops and stalls were also running throughout the day simultaneously with the musical entertainment. Valefest 2011 also presented a live performance of X, which was commissioned specifically for the festival with the aim of focusing upon human trafficking.

The causes were chosen to address the issue of human trafficking in part as a response to work within the Midlands. The money raised by Valefest for The Calla Trust and Helen Bamber Foundation would aim to provide training and counselling directly to those involved, as well as working toward durable solutions.

Vale Fest 2012 was on 2 June, raising money for Action for Children and War Child, with both charities focusing on relief for children in warzones.  Electric Swing Circus, whose guitarist Tom Hyland was part of the original Vale Festival organisers, headlined the Main Stage.

On 1 June, Vale Festival 2013 introduced the Beats Around the Bush dance stage. Magnus Puto headlined the Main Stage, and the focus of this year was 'Music for the Mind', specifically student depression and adolescent mental health. £15,000 was raised and completely donated to two charities: Students Against Depression and YoungMinds. The main-stage headliner was The Magnus Puto.

2014's Valefest was on 7 June, with cancer charities Macmillan Cancer Support and Trekstock selected as the charities to have money raised for them. Electric Swing Circus returned as headliners, with the woodland Dance Stage returning by popular demand. This event was the most successful so far, raising over £25,000 for both charities.

This ValeFest saw a focus on the rebranding of the festival as a sustained and continuous annual festival, with the official event renaming and branding as 'ValeFest', while the committee of student volunteers remained 'The Vale Festival'. It was decided that poverty would be the focus of this years festival, with proceeds received by Child Poverty Action Group and Medic Malawi. A change in infrastructure and professionalism led to a greater emphasis on expanding the festival beyond students. The Main Stage was headlined by Will and The People, and the dance stage by New York Transit Authority.

Taking place on 4 June, the charities chosen for ValeFest 2016 were Action Against Malaria Foundation and Birmingham Children's Hospital. The festival was headlined by The Dub Pistols, alongside Adam Barnes, Everybody Looks Famous and Shadow City.

In 2017, the theme of the charities was mental health. The chosen charities for 2017 were Rape & Sexual Violence Project, a charity providing support across Birmingham and Solihull, and BasicNeeds, a global mental health organisation. Headlining the festival were The Mouse Outfit, Bodalia, Buckfast Boys Club, Lisbon and IORA.

2018 saw the festival grow bigger than ever before, with headline acts Fickle Friends and Little Comets causing tickets to sell out in record time. The chosen charities were ShelterBox and Sifa Fireside.

Growing from the success of 2018, 2019's event took place on 8 June. It was the biggest year to date with the event selling out before the lineup was announced. Acts at the 2019 festival included The Hunna headlining with Saint Raymond, Ivory Wave and Chopstick Dubplate also performing. More tickets were sold than ever before to raise money for the chosen charities, St Basil's, Sense and Kids Adventure.

2020s 

The 2020 festival was cancelled due to Covid-19. A virtual festival named ValeFest Goes Virtual took place online on the day of the event. The online festival raised £4763.86 for the charities RSVP West Midlands and Just Like Us.

Organisation 

A committee team is assembled at the start of the academic year. Everything is planned by students and the numbers on the committee increase in number year on year. A core committee maintains the four sub-committees, which take responsibility for different aspects of the festival; these are the Entertainment, Site, Marketing and Relations.

See also

 University of Birmingham Guild of Students

References

External links
 
 Official ValeFest Facebook page
 University of Birmingham Guild of Students Society page 
 ValeFest Twitter profile
 ValeFest Instagram profile
 University of Birmingham Guild of Students
 People and Planet review of 2005 event 

Music festivals in the West Midlands (county)
Festivals in Birmingham, West Midlands
2005 establishments in England
Music festivals established in 2005